Lee Seong-hwa (Hangul: 이성화; born December 8, 1986), better known by his stage name Gray (Hangul: 그레이; stylized as GRAY), is a South Korean singer, rapper and record producer. In 2012, he released his debut single "Blink". In 2021, he released his first studio album Grayground. He is currently signed to hip hop label AOMG.

Early life and career 
Gray started composing songs when he was 17. He studied computer engineering at Hongik University. He joined AOMG in 2013 and contributed greatly to the growth of the label. He produced many hit songs such as Woo's "We Are" as well as high-quality hip-hop tracks such as Jay Park's "On It".

Discography

Studio albums

Maxi single

Singles

As a featured artist

As producer

Filmography

Film

Television

Music video appearances

Awards and nominations

References

External links

South Korean male rappers
South Korean hip hop record producers
1986 births
Living people